Chipman Airport  is a private airfield located  southwest of Chipman, New Brunswick, Canada.

References

External links
Page about this airport on COPA's Places to Fly airport directory

Registered aerodromes in New Brunswick
Transport in Queens County, New Brunswick
Buildings and structures in Queens County, New Brunswick